Pavel Ploc (born 26 December 1943) is a Czech biathlete. He competed at the 1968 Winter Olympics and the 1972 Winter Olympics.

References

1943 births
Living people
Czech male biathletes
Olympic biathletes of Czechoslovakia
Biathletes at the 1968 Winter Olympics
Biathletes at the 1972 Winter Olympics
Sportspeople from Pardubice